Anthony DeSando (born December 4, 1965), also known as Anthony Joseph De Santis, is an American actor. DeSando often portrays a joker or dapper villain in mob films such as New Jack City.

Early life 
DeSando was born in Jersey City, New Jersey.

Career 
DeSando has appeared in episodes of L.A. Law, Crossing Jordan, NYPD Blue, Without a Trace, CSI: Miami and Sex and the City. One of his more prominent roles is Brendan Filone in The Sopranos. He also starred in Federal Hill along with A Day in Black and White and co-starred in the movies xent, Beer League, Kiss Me, Guido, and The Whole Shebang. He also did the voice of Reggie in the video game The Sopranos: Road to Respect. He appeared as a character in Dito Montiel's films A Guide to Recognizing Your Saints and Fighting. In 2016, he made a cameo in "Friends in Need", the 17th episode of the 6th season of the police procedural drama Blue Bloods, playing the role of Joey Ruscoli, cousin of Detective Anthony Abetemarco. He is an alumnus of The Shakespeare Lab: The Public Theater's Program for Professional Actor Development.

Personal life 
DeSando is married to actress Bridgit Ryan. He is also a licensed massage therapist.

Filmography

Film

Television

Video games

References

External links
 

1965 births
American people of Italian descent
American male television actors
Living people
American male film actors